Ahn Sook Sun (安淑善, 안숙선, born September 5, 1949) is a Pansori singer and a Living National Treasure in South Korea. 

She is currently regarded as a famous pansori singer with both skill and popularity among pansori masterpieces, and is known as "Eternal Chunhyang (영원한 춘향)", "The Best Sounder of Our Times" and "Primadonna of the Gugak world" and is a musician who is gaining worldwide fame.

She was invited to perform at the 2018 K-music Festival in London.

Biography
Ahn was born in Namwon in 1949, which is the home of pansori Heungbuga, Chunhyangga and "Eastern style" of pansori(known as dongpyeonje). At nine, she was introduced to pansori by her aunt kang soon young, who helped start learn pansori from  Joo kwang-duk. During her teens, she learned the songs of the classic five madangs. After arriving in Seoul in her 20s, she learned more skills from Kim so hee  and joined the national Changgeuk production team at age 31.
She was awarded officier of the Ordre des Arts et des Lettres in 1998 with  praise.
She also performed at the avignon festival in 1998

References 

20th-century South Korean women singers
South Korean Buddhists
1949 births
Living people
People from Namwon
21st-century South Korean women singers